Douglas Wick is an American film producer whose work includes producing Gladiator, Stuart Little, and Memoirs of a Geisha.

Life and career 
Wick is the son of actress Mary Jane (Woods) and United States Information Agency director Charles Z. Wick. Following his cum laude graduation from Yale University, where he was a member of Wolf's Head Society, Douglas Wick began work for filmmaker Alan J. Pakula as his "coffee boy". In 1979, Wick would get his first film credit when he served as associate producer on Pakula's film Starting Over. Wick's first solo producing job came on the 1988 film Working Girl. His next film, Wolf, would reunite Wick with Mike Nichols, who directed Working Girl, before he went on to produce the 1996 film The Craft. The year of 1999 saw Wick produce both the critical-hit Girl, Interrupted and the box-office hit Stuart Little. The following year brought with it Wick's biggest success to date, Gladiator. This film would net Wick an Academy Award, a Golden Globe, and a BAFTA award all for "Best Picture". Also in 2000 Wick produced the Sci Fi hit Hollow Man. In the next few years Wick would produce Spy Game, Peter Pan (the first live action version of the J.M. Barrie classic tale), a successful Stuart Little sequel Stuart Little 2, and Win a Date with Tad Hamilton!. In 2005, Wick produced two more critical hits, Jarhead and Memoirs of a Geisha as well as two lesser successes Bewitched and another Stuart Little sequel Stuart Little 3: Call of the Wild. Wick produced the moderate success of RV and a Hollow Man sequel Hollow Man 2 in 2006.

Wick and Red Wagon's most recent production was The Divergent Series, based on Veronica Roth's New York Times bestselling books. Divergent starred a cast of newcomers including Shailene Woodley, Theo James, Miles Teller and Ansel Elgort, as well as Oscar winner Kate Winslet. It was followed by the sequels Insurgent and Allegiant, which also stars Naomi Watts and Jeff Daniels. Previously, Fisher and Wick produced The Great Gatsby, directed by Baz Luhrmann and starring Leonardo DiCaprio, Tobey Maguire, and Carey Mulligan.

Wick has been married to Lucy Fisher since 1986, and together they have three daughters. Wick is also best friends with bluegrass musician Dave Rawlings and frequently visits him at his home in Nashville.

Red Wagon Entertainment

Douglas Wick is the founder of Red Wagon Entertainment and Red Wagon Productions. In 2000, he expanded the company to bring in Lucy Fisher, his partner and wife. Red Wagon Productions has been the production company on fifteen of the films Wick has produced, including: Girl, Interrupted; Spy Game; and Memoirs of a Geisha.

Filmography
He was a producer in all films unless otherwise noted.

Film

As writer

Miscellaneous crew

Thanks

Television

Awards 
Academy Awards
 Best Picture
 2000 Gladiator

Golden Globes
 Best Picture
 1988 Working Girl
 2000 Gladiator

BAFTA Awards
 Best Film
 2000 Gladiator

PGA Golden Laurel Awards
 Motion Picture Producer of the Year Award
 2000

NATO ShoWest Producer of the Year
 2002

References

External links

CuresNow  Organization co-founded by Douglas Wick
Official website of Red Wagon Entertainment, film studio founded by Douglas Wick

American film producers
Living people
Producers who won the Best Picture Academy Award
Place of birth missing (living people)
Year of birth missing (living people)
Yale University alumni
Filmmakers who won the Best Film BAFTA Award
Golden Globe Award-winning producers